Anderson's squirrel (Callosciurus quinquestriatus) is a species of rodent in the family Sciuridae. It is found in forests in China (Yunnan only) and Myanmar.

References

Callosciurus
Mammals described in 1871
Taxonomy articles created by Polbot